The  is a complex of conference center, hotel and memorial in Awaji, Hyōgo, built near the epicenter of the 1995 Great Hanshin Awaji earthquake. It was designed by Tadao Ando, 
who had begun planning for the project (as a park) prior to the earthquake.
The hotel is operated as the Westin .

Etymology 

 literally means "Dream Stage", from 
Metaphorically "a place in which to dream", 
the name refers to the aim of restoring the ecology of the island, whose soil had been partly removed for land reclamation in Osaka.

Hyakudanen  

The "hundred" refers to the number of mini-gardens and not the steps, as there are 1575 steps and 235 flights.

See also 
 Miracle Planet Museum of Plants, a nearby greenhouse
 The 100 Views of Nature in Kansai

References

External links

 Official site 
 The 100 step garden (Hyakudan-en): photos & background
 The Westin Awaji Island Resort & Conference Center: official site of the hotel

Hotels in Hyōgo Prefecture
Tadao Ando buildings
Parks and gardens in Hyōgo Prefecture
Monuments and memorials in Japan
Buildings and structures in Hyōgo Prefecture
Tourist attractions in Hyōgo Prefecture
Awaji, Hyōgo